is a Japanese actress. She graduated from Ibaraki Christian University Junior College.

Filmography

TV series

Films

References

External links
Profile at Tarento Database 

Japanese actresses
1969 births
Living people
Actors from Ibaraki Prefecture